The North Washington Historic District in Brownsville, Tennessee is a  historic district which was listed on the National Register of Historic Places in 2015.

It includes 126 contributing buildings and 25 non-contributing ones, as well a contributing structure and three non-contributing sites.

It was listed on the National Register consistent with guidelines established in a 2014 study of historic resources in Brownsville.

References

National Register of Historic Places in Tennessee
Haywood County, Tennessee